Threave Garden and Estate is a series of gardens owned and managed by the National Trust for Scotland, located near Castle Douglas in the historical county of Kirkcudbrightshire in Dumfries and Galloway region of Scotland.

Covering , the gardens are part of the  Threave Estate originally developed by William Gordon who bought the estate in 1867.  The garden is home to the Practical School of Horticulture.

The gardens include a working walled garden, a rock garden, several ponds and water features.  There is also a visitor centre and plant centre. The wider estate is managed as a nature reserve and is home to bats and ospreys, and includes part of the Loch Ken and River Dee Marshes Special Protection Area. Threave Castle is located on an island in the River Dee, at the north-west side of the estate.

The garden is listed in the Inventory of Gardens and Designed Landscapes in Scotland, the national listing of significant gardens, which is maintained by National Trust for Scotland.

References

External links
Threave Garden, National Trust for Scotland

Inventory of Gardens and Designed Landscapes
National Trust for Scotland properties
Gardens in Dumfries and Galloway